Gnocchi (singular gnocco) are a varied family of dumplings in Italian cuisine. They are made of small lumps of dough most traditionally composed of a simple combination of wheat flour, egg, salt, and potato. Variations of the dish supplement the simple recipe with flavour additives, such as semolina flour, cheese,  breadcrumbs, cornmeal or similar ingredients, and possibly including herbs, vegetables, and other ingredients. Base ingredients may be substituted with alternatives such as sweet potatoes for potatoes or rice flour for wheat flour. Such variations are often considered to be non-traditional. 

Gnocchi are commonly cooked in salted boiling water and then dressed with various sauces. They are usually eaten as a first course (primo piatto) as an alternative to soups (minestre) or pasta, but they can also be served as a contorno (side dish) to some main courses. Common accompaniments of gnocchi include melted butter with sage, pesto, as well as various sauces. Gnocchi may be homemade, made by specialty stores, or produced industrially and distributed refrigerated, dried, or frozen. Most gnocchi are boiled in water and then served with a sauce. Small soup gnocchi are sometimes made by pressing the dough through a coarse sieve or a perforated spoon.

Origin 
The word gnocchi may be derived from the Italian word nocchio, meaning a knot in wood, or from nocca, meaning knuckle. It has been a traditional type of Italian pasta since Roman times. It was introduced by the Roman legions during the expansion of the empire into the countries of the European continent. One ancient Roman recipe consists of a semolina porridge-like dough mixed with eggs; similar modern dishes include the baked gnocchi alla romana and Sardinian malloreddus, which do not contain eggs.

After potatoes were introduced to Europe, they were eventually incorporated into gnocchi recipes. Potato gnocchi are particularly popular in Abruzzo, Friuli-Venezia Giulia, Veneto, and Lazio.

Another hypothesis is that the name gnocchi comes from the occitan language of Nice in France where it is traditionnaly called "inhoc" (pronounced inyoc).

Production and packaging 
The dough for gnocchi is often rolled out before it is cut into small pieces about the size of a wine cork or smaller.  The dumplings may be pressed with a textured object, such as a fork or a cheese grater, to make ridges or cut into little lumps. Professional tools exist for this purpose, known as a gnocchi board or a cavarola board. 

Gnocchi that are homemade are usually consumed the same day they are made. However, they can be cut into bite-sized dumplings, spread evenly on a baking sheet, frozen, then packaged in an air-tight bag and back into the freezer for later consumption. This method can allow the gnocchi to last two months in the freezer. 

Commercial gnocchi are often sold under modified atmospheric packaging and may achieve a shelf life of two weeks or more under refrigeration. Some are sold in vacuum packaging that is shelf-stable, only needing refrigeration once it is opened.

Varieties 

Gnocchi vary in recipe and name across different regions.

Regional 
Lombard and Tuscan malfatti (literally poorly made) are made with ricotta, flour and spinach, as well as the addition of various other herbs if required. Tuscan gnudi distinctively contains less flour; but some varieties are flour-based, like the Campanian strangulaprievete, the Apulian cavatelli, the Sardinian malloreddus, and so on.  Certain kinds are made of cooked polenta or semolina, which is spread out to dry, layered with cheese and butter, and baked.

Gnocchi di pane (literally "bread lumps"), derived from the Semmelknödel, is made from breadcrumbs and is popular in Friuli-Venezia Giulia, Veneto and Trentino-Alto Adige/Südtirol. Another variety from the latter region is spinach gnocchi.

International

Austria 

In Austria, gnocchi are a common main or side dish, known by the original name and Austrian variant, nockerl (pl. nockerln). As a side dish, they may accompany main dishes like goulash.

Croatia 
Gnocchi are very popular and often served as a dish in coastal Croatia, typically being served as a first course or a side dish with Dalmatinska pašticada. The Croatian name for gnocchi is 'njoki'.

Slovenia 
Gnocchi, known locally as "njoki," are common in Slovenia's Primorska region, which shares many of its culinary traditions with neighboring Italy.

Poland 
An almost identical creation are 'kluski leniwe' ("lazy dumplings"), but these do not contain egg. They are often seasoned with various spices like pepper, cinnamon, or allspice. Similar in shape are kopytka ("hooves"), simple dough dumplings in the shape of a diamond, which do not contain cheese. Both are often served with sour cream, butter, caramelized onion, mushroom sauce, or gravy.

France 
The name is also used in France in the dish known as gnocchis à la parisienne, a hot dish comprising gnocchi formed of choux pastry served with Béchamel sauce. A specialty of Nice, the gnocchi de tantifla a la nissarda, is made with potatoes, wheat flour and eggs. Another version including blette (Swiss chard), which is also used for the tourte de blette is called merda dé can.

In the region of Provence, potatoes gnocchis can be made in a longer shape and called longettes.

South America 
Due to the significant number of Italian immigrants who arrived in Argentina, Paraguay and Uruguay, gnocchi, ñoqui (Spanish) or nhoque (Portuguese) is a popular dish, even in areas with few Italian immigrants. In Uruguay, Paraguay, and Argentina, there is a tradition of eating gnocchi on the 29th of each month, with some people putting money beneath their plates to bring prosperity. Indeed, in Argentina and Uruguay ñoqui is slang for a bogus employee (according to corrupt accountancy practices, or, in the public sector, the distribution of political patronage), who only turns up at the end of the month to receive their salary.

Gallery

See also 

 List of dumplings
 List of pastas
 Schupfnudel

References

Further reading 

 Davidson, Alan. The Oxford Companion to Food, s.v. gnocchi.
 Jenkins, Nancy Harmon. Flavors of Tuscany. 1998.
 Garnerone, Myriam. "Traditions et Cuisine du pays niçois, Recettes Niçoises de nos Grands-Mères". 2008.

Dumplings
Italian cuisine
French cuisine
Austrian cuisine
Croatian cuisine
Slovenian cuisine
Brazilian cuisine
Argentine cuisine
Uruguayan cuisine
Paraguayan cuisine
Types of pasta